The 1936 Georgia Bulldogs football team  represented the Georgia Bulldogs of the University of Georgia during the 1936 college football season. The Bulldogs completed the season with a 5–4–1 record.

Schedule

References

Georgia
Georgia Bulldogs football seasons
Georgia Bulldogs football